Joseph Morrison may refer to:

Joseph Curran Morrison (1816–1885), lawyer, judge and political figure in Canada West
Joseph G. Morrison (1871–1947), minister and general superintendent in the Church of the Nazarene
Joseph Wanton Morrison (1783–1826), British soldier in the War of 1812
Joe Morrison (1937–1989), NFL football player
Joe Morrison (TV presenter), football presenter
Joseph Morrison (The Passage), fictional character

See also
Joseph Morrison Skelly, history professor